The 1950 United States Senate election in Nevada was held on November 7, 1950. Incumbent Democratic U.S. Senator Pat McCarran was re-elected to a fourth term in office over Republican George E. Marshall.

General election

Candidates
George E. Marshall (Republican)
Pat McCarran, incumbent U.S. Senator since 1933 (Democratic)

Results

See also 
 1950 United States Senate elections

References

Nevada
1950
United States Senate